Stacy Searels (born May 19, 1965) is the current  offensive line coach for the Georgia Bulldogs football team.

Playing years
A three-year starter on the offensive line at Auburn, Searels earned first-team All-America honors from both The Associated Press and Football News as a senior in 1987.

Coaching career
Searels coached the offensive line at Cincinnati for three seasons (2000-02) and at Appalachian State for seven seasons (1994-2000). He started his coaching career as a graduate assistant at Auburn, his alma mater, in 1992.

LSU
From 2003-06, Searels coached the offensive line at LSU, where he helped the Tigers win 44 games over four seasons and capture the 2003 BCS National Championship. Guard Stephen Peterman was drafted in the third round of the 2004 NFL Draft by the Cowboys, while tackle Andrew Whitworth was a second-round pick of the Bengals in 2006.

Georgia
Searels coached the offensive line at Georgia for four seasons. He added the duties of running game coordinator in 2009. During his time in Athens, the Bulldogs ranked in the top 25 in the nation in fewest sacks allowed three times, including ranking sixth and leading the SEC in 2009 with just 12.

Texas
During his first season at Texas, Searels helped the Longhorns rank 21st nationally and third in the Big 12 with 210.4 rushing yards per game.
In 2012, the offensive line, which was without a senior starter, allowed the opposition to post just 4.1 tackles for loss per game, which ranked tied for third in the country.
In 2013, his final season at Texas, Searels’ line enabled the Longhorns to finish 36th in the country in rushing offense and 17th in sacks allowed per game. Trey Hopkins was named first-team All-Big 12, while Donald Hawkins secured a spot on the second team.

Virginia Tech
On January 22, 2014, Frank Beamer named Searels the Offensive Line coach at Virginia Tech.

Miami
On January 2, 2016, University of Miami football head coach Mark Richt named Searels as the Hurricanes’ offensive line coach for the start of the 2016 campaign. Miami’s offensive line played a key role in running back Mark Walton becoming just the 11th 1,000-yard rusher in Miami history in 2016.

North Carolina 
On January 9, 2019, Searels was announced as the new offensive line coach at North Carolina. He left Chapel Hill to return to Georgia a day prior to the start of the Tar Heels' spring practice session in February 2022.

Return to Georgia 
On February 28, 2022, it was reported that Searels would leave North Carolina to return to Georgia as offensive line coach, replacing Matt Luke, who resigned to spend more time with family. He won his first championship as a coach with Georgia when they defeated TCU in the National Championship.

References

External links

1965 births
Living people
Auburn Tigers football coaches
Auburn Tigers football players
Cincinnati Bearcats football coaches
Georgia Bulldogs football coaches
LSU Tigers football coaches
Miami Hurricanes football coaches
North Carolina Tar Heels football coaches
Texas Longhorns football coaches
New York/New Jersey Knights players